Otaslavice is a municipality and village in Prostějov District in the Olomouc Region of the Czech Republic. It has about 1,300 inhabitants.

Sights

Main sights in Otaslavice are the Church of Saint Michael and ruins of Otaslavice Castle.

Notable people
Josef František (1914–1940), fighter pilot

References

Villages in Prostějov District